Joseph Tawadros  (born 6 October 1983) is an Egyptian-born Coptic Australian multi-instrumentalist and oud virtuoso. Tawadros has won the ARIA Award for Best World Music Album five times: 2012, 2013, 2014, 2020. and 2021.

Biography

Tawadros’ family emigrated from Egypt to Australia when he was three. Initially attracted to the trumpet, he decided to learn the oud when he was eight, after seeing a movie about Egyptian musician Sayed Darwish. Elected School Captain at Randwick Boys High School, where he was taught by Derek Williams. Tawadros is classically trained, having completed a Bachelor of Music degree at the University of New South Wales, where he was awarded a Freedman Fellowship for Classical Music. His brother James Tawadros is also a musician. In the 2000s, Tawadros also studied in Egypt with violin player Esawi Dagher, son of the renowned violin player Abdo Dagher. During the years that followed, Tawadros spent three months a year in Egypt and learned to play other instruments: the bamboo flute nay, the Arabic zither qanun and the cello.

At the ARIA Music Awards of 2012, he won Best World Music Album for Concerto of the Greater Sea (February 2012). He won the same category in 2013 for Chameleons of the White Shadow (February 2013), 2014 for Permission to Evaporate (May 2014) and 2020 for Live at the Sydney Opera House (June 2020). He also won Best Original Soundtrack, Cast or Show Album in 2017 for Ali's Wedding (September 2017).

Style

Joseph Tawadros' style is described as eclectic. According to Sydney Morning Herald, "he has taken the oud out of its traditional Middle Eastern setting and into the realm of classical music and jazz".
"I don't like to play in a particular genre, I love all sorts of music", Tawadros explains, "I try to record an album a year and one that's totally different from the previous album". He has collaborated with musicians such as John Abercrombie, Jack DeJohnette, Roy Ayers, Bela Fleck, Joey DeFrancesco, the Australian Chamber Orchestra and The Academy of Ancient Music.

Tawadros plays 52 instruments on his albums including oud, qanun, saz, violin, ney, Portuguese guitar, electric bass, kalimba and accordion. His brother James uses 11 percussion instruments.

Discography

Albums

Awards

AIR Awards
The Australian Independent Record Awards (commonly known informally as AIR Awards) is an annual awards night to recognise, promote and celebrate the success of Australia's Independent Music sector.

! 
|-
| AIR Awards of 2014
|Permission to Evaporate
| Best Independent Jazz Album Album
| 
|
|-
| AIR Awards of 2018
| Live at Abbey Road
| Best Independent Jazz Album Album
| 
| 
|-
| AIR Awards of 2020
|Betrayal of a Sacred Sunflower 
| Best Independent Classical Album
| 
|
|-
| AIR Awards of 2021
| Live at the Sydney Opera House 
| Best Independent Classical Album or EP
| 
| 
|-
| AIR Awards of 2022
| Hope in an Empty City
| Best Independent Jazz Album or EP
| 
|

ARIA Music Awards

The ARIA Music Awards is an annual awards ceremony that recognises excellence, innovation, and achievement across all genres of Australian music. Tawadros has won seven awards from nineteen nominations.

|-
| 2004
| Storyteller
| Best World Music Album
| 
|-
| 2006
| Visions (with James Tawadros)
| Best World Music Album 
| 
|-
| 2007
| Epiphany
| Best World Music Album
| 
|-
| 2008
| Angel
| Best World Music Album
| 
|-
| rowspan="2"| 2010
| The Prophet
| Best World Music Album
| 
|-
| The Hours of Separation
| Best Jazz Album
| 
|-
| 2011
| Band of Brothers (with Slava & Leonard Grigoryan & James Tawadros)
| Best World Music Album
| 
|-
| 2012
| Concerto of the Greater Sea
| Best World Music Album
| 
|-
| 2013
| Chameleons of the White Shadow
| Best World Music Album
| 
|-
| 2014
| Permission to Evaporate
| Best World Music Album
| 
|-
| 2015
| Truth Seekers, Lovers and Warriors
| Best World Music Album
| 
|-
| 2016
| World Music
| Best World Music Album
| 
|-
| rowspan="2"| 2017
| Live at Abbey Road
| Best World Music Album
| 
|-
| Ali's Wedding 
| Best Original Soundtrack or Musical Theatre Cast Album
| 
|-
| 2018
| The Bluebird, The Mystic and the Fool
| Best World Music Album
| 
|-
| 2019
| Betrayal of a Sacred Sunflower
| Best World Music Album
| 
|-
| 2020
| Live at the Sydney Opera House
| Best World Music Album
| 
|-
| 2021
| Hope in an Empty City
| Best World Music Album
| 
|-
| 2022
| History Has a Heartbeat 
| Best World Music Album
|

See also
 Copts in Australia
 List of oud players

References

External links
 Official website
 Interview and highlights of a concert in Sarajevo Jazz Festival 2011

1983 births
ARIA Award winners
Living people
Australian oud players
Australian classical musicians
Australian people of Coptic descent
Australian people of Egyptian descent
Coptic musicians
Egyptian emigrants to Australia
Musicians from Cairo
Members of the Order of Australia
Australian multi-instrumentalists
Electric violinists